First introduced in 2003, the Ducati Multistrada is a series of V-twin and V4 touring focused motorcycles.  Essentially a hybrid of a supermoto and a sport-tourer, the Multistrada competes in the market with other dual-sport motorcycles such as the BMW GS. The first iteration of the Multistrada was, like the  Yamaha TDM850, neither intended nor suitable for off-road use. Subsequent models were more suited to a proper dual-sport role.

Designed by Pierre Terblanche as an evolution to his previous design, the Cagiva Gran Canyon, the original Multistrada drew mixed reviews for its unconventional aesthetics. The word Multistrada is Italian for "many roads".

Reception
Motor Cycle News described the original Multistrada 1000 as "a truly versatile motorcycle", but let down by "a smallish tank and limited performance".  Motorcycle Consumer News categorised the Multistrada as an "Open Standard".

Models
The Multistrada 1000DS was released in 2003. There were two basic Ducati Multistrada models in 2005, the 1000DS and the 620. There was also the 620 Dark entry model. For 2007, there were Multistrada 1100 and 1100S models.

Ducati Multistrada 1000DS
The 2005 Ducati Multistrada 1000DS has a 992 cc air cooled 90° V-twin engine with a 40 degree included valve angle, based on Ducati's existing engines, with twin-spark plug heads, pressure fed plain camshaft bearings, redesigned crankshaft, higher oil pressure and volume, and new alloy clutch basket, drive and driven plates. The 2006 1000DS uses Ducati's signature trellis frame with fully adjustable 165 mm travel Showa forks up front, and a single-sided swingarm, with a Showa fully adjustable rear shock coupled with a rising rate, height-adjustable suspension system at the rear. Brembo "Serie Oro" four piston brake callipers are used in the front and rear disc brakes. Front 320 mm discs, single 245 mm rear disc, and steel-braided brake lines are used throughout. The discs are now mounted directly to oversized hubs, eliminating the disc carriers.

Ducati Multistrada 620
Entry level Multistradas feature a number of individual components, like the double sided "Monster" style swing arm, the integrated die cast front and rear footrests, and the three spoke alloy wheels. The cheapest Multistrada is the 620 Dark, with its matt black colour scheme and single 320 mm front disk. There are also parts that look the same, but aren't, like the fuel tank which although of identical size as the 1000s, due to design simplification will only hold 15 liters until the bike is ridden a short distance and refilled, to full 20 liter capacity and the simpler instrument panel without on-board computer functions.  All body panels are identical to those of the 1000, and 1100: except the locking right front glove box which is not included on the 620 models (although the locking version  can be retrofitted if desired).

The frame is as big as the Multistrada 1000 DS frame, but is different at the rear, where the single sided swing arm has been replaced by a double sided swing arm. Suspension features Marzocchi 43 mm upside down front forks and a Sachs rear monoshock with adjustable preload and rebound. The braking system has a rear disk and two 300 mm front disks with floating callipers operated by a new front master cylinder.

The 620 has an APTC wet clutch. According to Ducati, the wet clutch reduces lever operating effort, ensuring gradual engagement, and incorporates a racing derived "slipper" device to reduce the tendency for the rear wheel to lock-up or chatter during aggressive downshifting.

History

2003–2004
The first version to be sold in 2003 had a 1,000 cc engine, but a smaller 620 cc version was introduced in 2005. The 2003 model Multistrada received most of its criticisms because of its seat, described as "a vinyl covered sheet of plywood" by Motorcyclist magazine, and windscreen that caused undue buffeting.

2005–2006
In 2005, the 1000DS Multistrada received an improved side stand (the 2003–2004 side stand was too short and made the bike prone to accidental tip-over), redesigned seats with softer padding and less angular shapes, improved mirrors with longer stems for better visibility and the optional touring screen from the 2003–2004 model year became standard. 2005 also saw the introduction of the 1000DS S model that came with Öhlins suspension, black wheels and carbon fiber belt covers and front fender. The S-model also came with an aluminum oversized handlebar that was said to reduce vibration and improve handling.

2007
In 2007, the 1,000 cc engine was replaced with a 1,100 cc engine that was claimed to produce an extra  of torque and the 620 model was dropped. Both the S and standard models came with black wheels but the suspension on the standard model was changed from the Showa components of previous years to a Marzocchi front fork and a Sachs rear shock. In order to make the S-model more appealing, it was fitted with fully adjustable Ohlin's suspension front and rear. Ducati also claimed to have improved fuel gauge accuracy, improved vibration isolated handlebars were introduced to reduce rider fatigue. A closed loop fuel injection system replaced the open loop FI system on the 1,000 cc models and the characteristic dry clutch was replaced with a conventional wet-clutch.

2008–2009
In 2008, the bike received minor tweaks to the decals changing to a font that closer resembles the graphics on the Ducati 1098. The closed loop FI systems also got some fine tuning to make it more refined. It also got a timer switch for the lights (the lights come on with the ignition and have no off switch) that shuts them off after 60 seconds if the engine has not been started, helping to increase battery life. The factory fitted immobiliser, for better security, remained standard, as it was since 2003 with the model's release.

2010

A new model called the Multistrada 1200 was presented at 2009 EICMA in Milan.  It includes throttle by wire, a detuned version of the 1,200 cc liquid-cooled engine from the Ducati 1198 sportbike, and optional electronically adjustable suspension.

2015
With the third generation of Multistrada, Ducati focused particularly on the engine mechanics which includes a Testastretta DVT with 160 HP and 136 Nm of torque. It is equipped with Double Variable Timing - both the intake and exhaust valves can vary the timing. There is a later update with a new engine, the 1262 cc Testastretta 11° DVT that was used to power the Diavel.

2021
The 2021 range brings the fourth generation to its debut, featuring important innovations. The most obvious concerns the new 1158 cm³ and 170 HP at 10,500 rpm V4 Granturismo engine: it is a four-cylinder that abandons the historic desmodromic distribution for a more classic spring return of the valves. The V4 Granturismo engine adopts deactivation of the rear bank at idle so that there is no combustion in the cylinders, reducing consumption and improving thermal comfort thanks to lower temperatures. The frame was also revolutionized: from the steel tube trellis to the aluminum monocoque. As already seen on the previous Enduro and 950 models, the double sided swingarm and 19" front wheel are adopted across the entire range. On the V4 the suspension is fully adjustable Marzocchi mechanicals, while the V4 S is equipped with Ducati Skyhook semi-active Suspension Evolution with auto-leveling function for automatic height adjustment from the ground. An absolute first is the ARAS system featuring front and rear radar, through which it is possible to implement adaptive cruise control and blind spot detection.

With the 2022 model year, the Pikes Peak trim level returns, which is now clearly different from the rest of the range: the sporty characterization of the model includes the new single-sided swingarm (unpublished on the V4) and the 17" front wheel, combined with specific geometries for wheelbase, trail, steering head rake, raised footrests and narrower handlebars, and the "Race" configuration is making its debut on a Multistrada instead of the "Enduro" one, a mode recommended for circuit riding. the new Öhlins Smart EC 2.0 electronic suspension, the approved Akrapovic titanium and carbon silencer, the forged aluminum rims and various carbon racing details such as the mudguard and front part to lighten the bike. Also in 2022, the V4 version is presented a Rally version dedicated to travel, with semi-active suspension with increased travel to 200 mm, Power Mode dedicated to off-road use, Auto function levelling, which guarantees a constant set-up as the rider, passenger and luggage configuration changes and a new 30-litre aluminum tank.

References

External links

 Official model information at Ducati.com
 Motorcyclist magazine Multistrada road test
 Motorcycle USA Multistrada Road Test

Multistrada
Motorcycles introduced in 2003
Dual-sport motorcycles
Standard motorcycles
Motorcycles designed by Pierre Terblanche